The fig is the edible fruit of Ficus carica, a species of small tree in the flowering plant family Moraceae, native to the Mediterranean region, together with western and southern Asia. It has been cultivated since ancient times and is now widely grown throughout the world, both for its fruit and as an ornamental plant. Ficus carica is the type species of the genus Ficus, containing over 800 tropical and subtropical plant species.

Its large leaves have three to five deep lobes. The milky sap of the green parts is an irritant to human skin. In the Northern Hemisphere, fresh figs are in season from late summer to early autumn. They tolerate moderate seasonal frost and can be grown even in hot-summer continental climates.

Figs can be eaten fresh or dried, or processed into jam, rolls, biscuits and other types of desserts. Since ripe fruit does not transport and keep well, most commercial production is in dried and processed forms. Raw figs contain roughly 80% water and 20% carbohydrates, with negligible protein, fat and micronutrient content. They are a moderate source of dietary fiber.

In 2018, world production of raw figs was 1.14 million tonnes, led by Turkey and North African countries (Egypt, Morocco, and Algeria) as the largest producers, collectively accounting for 64% of the total.

Etymology
The word fig, first recorded in English in the 13th century, derives from (Old) French figue, itself from Occitan (Provençal) figa, from Romance *fica, from Classical Latin ficus (fig or fig-tree). Italian has fico, directly derived from Latin ficus. The name of the caprifig, Ficus caprificus Risso, is derived both from Latin capro (billygoat) and English fig.

Biology

Description

The fig fruit develops as a hollow, fleshy structure called the syconium that is lined internally with numerous unisexual flowers. The tiny flowers bloom inside this cup-like structure. Although commonly called a fruit, the syconium is botanically an infructescence, a type of multiple fruit. The small fig flowers and later small single-seeded (true) fruits line its interior surface. A small opening or ostiole, visible on the middle of the fruit, is a narrow passage that allows the specialized fig wasp, Blastophaga psenes, to enter the inflorescence and pollinate the flowers, after which each fertilized ovule (one per flower, in its ovary) develops into a seed. At maturity, these seeds (actually single-seeded fruits) line the inside of each fig. See Ficus: Fig fruit and reproduction system.

The edible mature syconium develops into a fleshy false fruit bearing the numerous one-seeded fruits, which are technically drupelets. Ficus carica has milky sap, produced by laticifer cells. The sap of the green parts is an irritant to human skin.

Habitat

The common fig tree has been cultivated since ancient times and grows wild in dry and sunny locations with deep and fresh soil, and in rocky locations that are at sea level to 1,700 metres in elevation. It prefers relatively porous and freely draining soil, and can grow in nutritionally poor soil. Unlike other fig species, Ficus carica does not always require pollination by a wasp or from another tree, but can be pollinated by the fig wasp, Blastophaga psenes to produce seeds. Fig wasps are not present to pollinate in colder regions such as the British Isles.

The species has become naturalized in scattered locations in Asia and North America.

The plant tolerates seasonal drought, and the Middle Eastern and Mediterranean climates are especially suitable to it. Situated in a favorable habitat, mature specimens can grow to considerable size as large, dense, shade trees. Its aggressive root system precludes its cultivation in many urban locations, yet in nature this characteristic helps the plant to root in the most inhospitable locations. Having a great need of water, it is mostly a phreatophyte that extracts the needed water from sources in or on the ground. Consequently, it frequently grows in locations with standing or running water, e. g. in valleys of rivers and in ravines that collect water. The deeply rooted plant searches for groundwater in aquifers, ravines, or cracks in rocks. With access to this water, the tree cools the hot environments in which it grows, thus producing fresh and pleasant habitat for many animals that shelter in its shade during periods of intense heat.

The mountain or rock fig is a wild variety, tolerant of cold dry climates, of the semi-arid rocky montane regions of Iran, especially in the Kūhestān mountains of Khorasan.

Ecology
Ficus carica is dispersed by birds and mammals that scatter their seeds in droppings. Fig fruit is an important food source for much of the fauna in some areas, and the tree owes its expansion to those that feed on its fruit. The common fig tree also sprouts from the root and stolon tissues.

Cultivation

From ancient times

The edible fig is one of the first plants that were cultivated by humans. Nine subfossil figs of a parthenocarpic (and therefore sterile) type dating to about 9400–9200 BC were found in the early Neolithic village Gilgal I (in the Jordan Valley, 13 km north of Jericho). The find precedes the domestication of wheat, barley, and legumes, and may thus be the first known instance of agriculture. It is proposed that this sterile but desirable type was planted and cultivated intentionally, one thousand years before the next crops were domesticated (wheat and rye).

Figs were widespread in ancient Greece, and their cultivation was described by both Aristotle and Theophrastus. Aristotle noted that as in animal sexes, figs have individuals of two kinds, one (the cultivated fig) that bears fruit, and one (the wild caprifig) that assists the other to bear fruit. Further, Aristotle recorded that the fruits of the wild fig contain psenes (fig wasps); these begin life as larvae, and the adult psen splits its "skin" (pupa) and flies out of the fig to find and enter a cultivated fig, saving it from dropping. Theophrastus observed that just as date palms have male and female flowers, and that farmers (from the East) help by scattering "dust" from the male onto the female, and as a male fish releases his milt over the female's eggs, so Greek farmers tie wild figs to cultivated trees. They do not say directly that figs reproduce sexually, however.

Figs were also a common food source for the Romans. Cato the Elder, in his c. 160 BC De Agri Cultura, lists several strains of figs grown at the time he wrote his handbook: the Mariscan, African, Herculanean, Saguntine, and the black Tellanian (De agri cultura, ch. 8). The fruits were used, among other things, to fatten geese for the production of a precursor of foie gras. Rome's first emperor, Augustus, was reputed to have been poisoned with figs from his garden smeared with poison by his wife Livia. For this reason, or perhaps because of her horticultural expertise, a variety of fig known as the Liviana was cultivated in Roman gardens.

It was cultivated from Afghanistan to Portugal, also grown in Pithoragarh in the Kumaon hills of India. From the 15th century onwards, it was grown in areas including Northern Europe and the New World. In the 16th century, Cardinal Reginald Pole introduced fig trees to Lambeth Palace in London.

In 1769, Spanish missionaries led by Junipero Serra brought the first figs to California. The Mission variety, which they cultivated, is still popular. The fact that it is parthenocarpic (self-pollinating) made it an ideal cultivar for introduction.

The Kadota cultivar is even older, being mentioned by the Roman naturalist Pliny the Elder in the 1st century A.D. Pliny recorded thirty varieties of figs.

Overwintering
People of the Italian diaspora who live in cold-winter climates have the practice of burying imported fig trees to overwinter them and protect the fruiting hard wood from cold. Italian immigrants to America in the 19th century introduced this common practice in cities such as New York, Philadelphia, Boston, and Toronto, where winters are normally too cold to leave the tree exposed. This practice consists in digging a trench that is appropriate to the size of the specimen, some of which are more than 10 feet tall, severing part of the root system, and bending the specimen into the trench. Specimens are often wrapped in waterproof material to discourage development of mould and fungus, then covered with a heavy layer of soil and leaves. Sometimes plywood or corrugated metal is placed on top to secure the tree. In borderline climates like New York City burying trees is no longer needed because low winter temperatures have increased. Often specimens are simply wrapped in plastic and other insulating material, or not protected if planted in a sheltered site against a wall that absorbs sunlight.

Modern

The common fig is grown for its edible fruit throughout the temperate world. It is also grown as an ornamental tree, and in the UK the cultivars 'Brown Turkey' and ‘Ice Crystal’ (mainly grown for its unusual foliage) have gained the Royal Horticultural Society's Award of Garden Merit.

Figs are also grown in Germany, mainly in private gardens inside built up areas. There is no commercial fig growing. The Palatine region in the German South West has an estimated 80,000 fig trees. The variety Brown Turkey is the most widespread in the region. There are about a dozen quite widespread varieties hardy enough to survive winter outdoors mostly without special protection. There are even two local varieties, "Martinsfeige" and "Lussheim", which may be the hardiest varieties in the region.

As the population of California grew, especially after the gold rush, a number of other cultivars were brought there by persons and nurserymen from the east coast of the US and from France and England. By the end of the 19th century, it became apparent that California had the potential for being an ideal fig producing state because of its Mediterranean-like climate and latitude of 38 degrees, lining up San Francisco with İzmir, Turkey. G. P. Rixford first brought true Smyrna figs to California in 1880. The cultivar, however, is not one that was produced by a breeding program, and instead is from one of the cuttings brought to California in the latter part of the 19th century. It is identical to the cultivar Lob Injir that has been grown in Turkey for centuries.

Figs can be found in continental climates with hot summers as far north as Hungary and Moravia. Thousands of cultivars, most named, have been developed as human migration brought the fig to many places outside its natural range. Fig plants can be propagated by seed or by vegetative methods. Vegetative propagation is quicker and more reliable, as it does not yield the inedible caprifigs. Seeds germinate readily in moist conditions and grow rapidly once established. For vegetative propagation, shoots with buds can be planted in well-watered soil in the spring or summer, or a branch can be scratched to expose the bast (inner bark) and pinned to the ground to allow roots to develop.

Two crops of figs can be produced each year. The first or breba crop develops in the spring on last year's shoot growth. The main fig crop develops on the current year's shoot growth and ripens in the late summer or fall. The main crop is generally superior in quantity and quality, but some cultivars such as 'Black Mission', 'Croisic', and 'Ventura' produce good breba crops.

There are three types of edible figs:
 Persistent (or common) figs have all female flowers that do not need pollination for fruiting; the fruit can develop through parthenocarpic means. This is a popular horticulture fig for home gardeners. Dottato (Kadota), Black Mission, Brown Turkey, Brunswick, and Celeste are some representative cultivars.
 Caducous (or Smyrna) figs require cross pollination by the fig wasp with pollen from caprifigs for the fruit to mature. If not pollinated the immature fruits drop. Some cultivars are Marabout, Inchàrio, and Zidi.
 Intermediate (or San Pedro) figs set an unpollinated breba crop but need pollination for the later main crop. Examples are Lampeira, King, and San Pedro.

There are dozens of fig cultivars, including main and breba cropping varieties, and an edible caprifig (the Croisic). Varieties are often local, found in a single region of one country.

Breeding
While the fig contains more naturally occurring varieties than any other tree crop, a formal breeding program was not developed until the beginning of the 20th century. Ira Condit, "High Priest of the Fig," and William Storey tested some thousands of fig seedlings in the early 20th century based at University of California, Riverside. It was then continued at the University of California, Davis. However, the fig breeding program was ultimately closed in the 1980s.

Due to insect and fungal disease pressure in both dried and fresh figs, the breeding program was revived in 1989 by James Doyle and Louise Ferguson using the germplasm established at UC Riverside by Ira Condit and William Storey. Crosses were made and two new varieties are now in production in California: the public variety "Sierra", and the patented variety "Sequoia".

Production

In 2020, world production of raw figs was 1.26 million tonnes, led by Turkey (with 25% of the world total), Egypt, Morocco, and Algeria as the largest producers collectively accounting for 62% of the total.

Food
Figs can be eaten fresh or dried, and used in jam-making. Most commercial production is in dried or otherwise processed forms, since the ripe fruit does not transport well, and once picked does not keep well. The widely produced fig roll ("Fig Newton" is a trademark of Nabisco) is a biscuit (or cookie) with a filling made from figs.

In the Northern Hemisphere, fresh figs are in season from August through to early October. Fresh figs used in cooking should be plump and soft, and without bruising or splits. If they smell sour, the figs have become over-ripe. Slightly under-ripe figs can be kept at room temperature for 1–2 days to ripen before serving. Figs are most flavorful at room temperature.

Nutrition

Raw figs are 79% water, 19% carbohydrates, 1% protein, and contain negligible fat (table).

When dehydrated to 30% water, figs have a carbohydrate content of 64%, protein content of 3%, and fat content of 1%. In a 100-gram serving, providing  of food energy, dried figs are a rich source (more than 20% DV) of dietary fiber and the essential mineral manganese (26% DV), while calcium, iron, magnesium, potassium, and vitamin K are in moderate amounts.

Research and folk medicine

Phytochemicals
Figs contain diverse phytochemicals under basic research for their potential biological properties, including polyphenols, such as gallic acid, chlorogenic acid, syringic acid, (+)-catechin, (−)-epicatechin and rutin. Fig color may vary between cultivars due to various concentrations of anthocyanins, with cyanidin-3-O-rutinoside having particularly high content.

Folk medicine
In some old Mediterranean folk practices, the milky sap of the fig plant was used to soften calluses, remove warts, and deter parasites.

Since the late 1800s, syrup of figs combined with senna has been available as a laxative.

Toxicity
Like other plant species in the family Moraceae, contact with the milky sap of Ficus carica followed by exposure to ultraviolet light can cause phytophotodermatitis, a potentially serious skin inflammation. Although the plant is not poisonous per se, F. carica is listed in the FDA Database of Poisonous Plants.

Organic chemical compounds called furanocoumarins are known to cause phytophotodermatitis in humans. The common fig contains significant quantities of two furanocoumarins, psoralen and bergapten. The essential oil of fig leaves contains more than 10% psoralen, the highest concentration of any organic compound isolated from fig leaves. Psoralen appears to be the primary furanocoumarin compound responsible for fig leaf-induced phytophotodermatitis.

Psoralen and bergapten are found chiefly in the milky sap of the leaves and shoots of F. carica but not the fruits. Neither psoralen nor bergapten were detected in the essential oil of fig fruits. Thus there is no conclusive evidence that fig fruits cause phytophotodermatitis.

Cultural significance

Babylonian mythology 
Babylonian Ishtar for example took the form of the divine fig tree Xikum, the "primeval mother at the central place of the earth", protectress of the saviour Tammuz. Moreover, figs and the fig tree were closely linked with female sexuality. According to Barbara Walker's encyclopedia on Goddess symbols, "This may account for the common use of the fig tree as a symbol of man's enlightenment, which was formerly supposed to come through his connection with the female principle."

Christianity and Judaism 

In the Biblical Book of Genesis, Adam and Eve clad themselves with fig leaves (Genesis 3:7) after eating the forbidden fruit from the tree of the knowledge of good and evil. Likewise, fig leaves, or depictions of fig leaves, have long been used to cover the genitals of nude figures in painting and sculpture, for example in Masaccio's The Expulsion from the Garden of Eden. Moreover, according to the Aggadah (Jewish text), the forbidden fruit of the Tree of Knowledge in the Garden of Eden was not an apple, but a fig. 

The Book of Deuteronomy specifies the fig as one of the Seven Species (Deuteronomy 8:7-8), describing the fertility of the land of Canaan. This is a set of seven plants indigenous to the Middle East that together can provide food all year round. The list is organized by date of harvest, with the fig being fourth due to its main crop ripening during summer.

The biblical quote "each man under his own vine and fig tree" (Micah 4:4) has been used to denote peace and prosperity. It was commonly quoted to refer to the life that would be led by settlers in the American West, and was used by Theodor Herzl in his depiction of the future Jewish Homeland: "We are a commonwealth. In form it is new, but in purpose very ancient. Our aim is mentioned in the First Book of Kings: 'Judah and Israel shall dwell securely, each man under his own vine and fig tree, from Dan to Beersheba". United States President George Washington, writing in 1790 to the Touro Synagogue of Newport, Rhode Island, extended the metaphor to denote the equality of all Americans regardless of faith.

Islam 
Sura 95 of the Qur'an is named al-Tīn (Arabic for "The Fig"), as it opens with the oath "By the fig and the olive."

Muhammad is said to have been fond of figs. Within the Hadith, Sahih al-Bukhari records Muhammad stating: "If I had to mention a fruit that descended from paradise, I would say this is it because the paradisiacal fruits do not have pits...eat from these fruits for they prevent hemorrhoids, prevent piles and help gout."

Fossil record
10 fossil endocarps of †Ficus potentilloides from the early Miocene, have been found in the Kristina Mine at Hrádek nad Nisou in North Bohemia, the Czech Republic. These fossils are similar to endocarps of F. carica.

See also

 Cursing of the fig tree
 Ficus racemosa ("Cluster fig"), a species native to Australia, Malesia, South-East Asia, and the Indian subcontinent
 Ficus sycomorus ("Sycamore fig"), a species native to Africa and Lebanon
 Fig cake
 Grocer's itch

References

 
Fig
Fruits originating in Africa
Fruits originating in Asia
Flora of Asia
Flora of Europe
Flora of North Africa
Least concern plants
Plants described in 1753
Garden plants of Africa
Garden plants of Asia
Ornamental trees
Aphrodisiac foods
Plants in the Bible
Taxa named by Carl Linnaeus